Factor 5 GmbH is an independent software and video game developer. The company was co-founded by five former Rainbow Arts employees in 1987 in Cologne, Germany, which served as the inspiration behind the studio's name.

In order to have a stronger relationship with Factor 5's North American partners like LucasArts, Factor 5, Inc. was established in the United States in May 1996 with legal support from LucasArts, and in late 1996 the core of the development team in Germany was relocated to the North American company headquarters in San Rafael, California. Julian Eggebrecht, one of the five initial co-founders, served as President of Factor 5's U.S. branch.

The U.S. company closed in May 2009, following the closure of Brash Entertainment, with which the company had multiple contracts. The original German company, headed by CEO Achim Moller, remained active due to its unrelated business policy and operations with the North American company.

However, in January 2011, Moller liquidated Factor 5 GmbH, and all game licenses were transferred to "Eggebrecht, Engel, Schmidt GbR".

On March 15, 2017, Factor 5 co-founder Julian Eggebrecht had announced that the company has returned and re-acquired the rights to the Turrican franchise.

History
The programming group which would eventually become Factor 5 had originally formed in the 1980s, in what cofounder Julian Eggebrecht described as a culture of hacking and multimedia programming on the local demo scene.  Eggebrecht attended the Filmhochschule in Munich to become a movie director, and all the other members studied computer science.

While its founders were still university students, Factor 5 started out in game development as a part-time activity under partnership with Rainbow Arts for the Amiga computer. There, they had their earliest moderate success with Katakis, an R-Type clone of impressive technical performance.  Due to the game's obvious similarity to R-Type, rights holder Activision Europe delivered an ultimatum: either Factor 5 accept a contract to perform the official R-Type conversion for the Amiga home computer, or receive a lawsuit for rights infringement.  According to Julian Eggebrecht, this was because "Activision couldn't find any programmers" however the opportunity was "a dream come true".

Their first important success, however, came with Turrican, a game designed by Rainbow Arts designer Manfred Trenz. Factor 5 handled the Amiga and Atari ST versions of the game; and together with the original Commodore 64 version and several others, Turrican was a major hit across Europe in 1990.

In 1991, faced with the prospect of corporate formalities imposed by the video game console industry, the company founders quit school in favor of full-time corporate careers. Eggebrecht explained, "[t]he moment you go into console programming, you won't get a development system from Nintendo unless you have a reputable company." After they finished work on Turrican II: The Final Fight for the Amiga and Atari ST in 1991, Factor 5 built their own development kits and software environments for the Super Nintendo Entertainment System and Sega Mega Drive/Genesis, codenamed Pegasus SNES and Pegasus Mega Drive. Subsequently, they decided to focus their efforts towards console game development in 1992 with several projects for the SNES and Mega Drive/Genesis, including new Turrican games and other titles contracted by companies like LucasArts, Hudson Soft and Konami, the latter of which had also Game Boy development contracts with them. In 1993, Factor 5 produced their last Amiga effort, an Amiga conversion of Mega Turrican handled with programming support from fellow company Neon Studios. They would develop games for the SNES, Mega Drive/Genesis, and Game Boy until 1996, when they switched their efforts to the PlayStation.

With the development of PlayStation games for LucasArts, the personnel located in Germany experienced communication difficulties in working with their North American partner due to the distance between both countries and the Internet speeds of that time being insufficient for the requirements of console development. This, together with legal assistance offered by LucasArts, resulted in a new Factor 5 branch in California.  There, the core of the development team from Germany was established after they finished work on their PlayStation games in late 1996.

For a long time, the North American branch of Factor 5 was an exclusive, prominent development partner with both LucasArts and Nintendo, developing both game titles for the former and middleware tools for the latter. During that time, the studio gained considerable critical and commercial praise for its technical proficiency, producing what are often cited as some of the most visually advanced titles on the Nintendo 64 and GameCube, all based on LucasArts properties. Two high-profile middleware tools were also developed by the company for Nintendo: MusyX, a sound system produced in cooperation with Dolby Laboratories; and the DivX For Games SDK, integrating the functionality of the popular video codec into Nintendo's development tools.

In late December 2008, several online media outlets reported that Brash Entertainment (Factor 5's publisher of their current project) would close at the end of the month after encountering financial problems.  This sudden interruption in funding left Factor 5 with their own funding difficulties, eventually causing its closure in May 2009.

Factor 5 had been involved in litigation with its former employees in the defunct North American Factor 5 company. The suit alleges that Factor 5 did not pay its employees for work during November and December, that employees were laid off without the required notice by law, that employees did not receive their vacation pay, and that the company misled the employees. The suit was filed in Marin Superior Court.

Games

Factor 5 GmbH

Amiga
1988: Katakis
1989: R-Type
1990: Turrican
1990: Masterblazer (intro only)
1991: Turrican II: The Final Fight
1991: The Adventures of Quik & Silva (under the pseudonym New Bits on the RAM)
1992: Metal Law (under the pseudonym New Bits on the RAM)
1992: BC Kid
1993: Turrican 3 (conversion program by Neon Studios)
1994: Tony & Friends in Kellogg's Land

Atari ST
1990: Turrican
1991: Turrican II: The Final Fight
1991: The Adventures of Quik & Silva (under the pseudonym New Bits on the RAM; port of Amiga version)

Super Nintendo Entertainment System
1993: Super Turrican
1994: Indiana Jones' Greatest Adventures
1995: Super Turrican 2

Sega Mega Drive/Genesis
1993: Mega Turrican (released in 1994)
1994: Mega Bomberman 8-players (unpublished demo)
1996: International Superstar Soccer Deluxe

Game Boy
1994: Contra: The Alien Wars
1995: Animaniacs

MS-DOS
1994: Tony & Friends in Kellogg's Land

PlayStation
1996: Star Wars: Rebel Assault II: The Hidden Empire
1997: Ballblazer Champions

Cancelled games
Indiana Jones' Greatest Adventures (completed but unreleased) (Sega Mega Drive/Genesis)

Factor 5, Inc

Nintendo 64
1998: Star Wars: Rogue Squadron
1999: Pokémon Stadium (Sound Compression Technology)
1999: Resident Evil 2 (Sound Compression Technology)
1999: Elmo's Letter Adventure (Sound Compression Technology)
2000: San Francisco Rush 2049 (Sound Compression Technology)
2000: Star Wars: Episode I: Battle for Naboo
2000: Indiana Jones and the Infernal Machine

Microsoft Windows
1999: Star Wars: Rogue Squadron 3D
2001: Star Wars Episode I: Battle for Naboo

GameCube
2001: Star Wars Rogue Squadron II: Rogue Leader
2003: Star Wars Rogue Squadron III: Rebel Strike

PlayStation 3
2007: Lair

Cancelled games
Animal Wars (PS3)
Icarus reboot of Kid Icarus (Wii) 
Untitled Pilotwings project (GameCube) 
Star Wars Rogue Squadron: Rogue Leaders Wii (completed but unreleased) (Wii)
Superman (PS3, Xbox 360, Wii)
Thornado (Nintendo 64)
Thornado (GameCube)
Turrican: Cyclone (PS3)
Virus (PS3)
WeFly (Wii)

Technology
MusyX: Dolby Sound Tools - Developed for Nintendo 64, GameCube, Game Boy Color, and Game Boy Advance
DivX For Games SDK - Developed for GameCube

References

External links

Factor 5 profile at IGN
Factor 5  profile at GameSpot

Video game companies of Germany
Video game companies of the United States
German companies established in 1987
Video game companies established in 1987
Video game companies established in 1996
Video game companies disestablished in 2011
Video game development companies
Companies based in San Rafael, California
Companies based in Cologne
Re-established companies